Elisabeth Ivanowna Epstein  (1879–1956) was a Russian painter.

Biography
Epstein née Hefter was born on 27 February 1879 in Zhytomyr, Russia. Her family moved to Moscow, then she located to Munich. In 1898 she married Meizyslaw Epstein, with whom she has one child. The couple divorced in 1911. In Munich she studied with Anton Ažbe, Alexej von Jawlensky, and Wassily Kandinsky. She also attended the salons hosted by fellow artist Marianne von Werefkin. Her work was included in the first Neue Künstlervereinigung München exhibit in 1911.

Around 1907 Epstein moved to Paris and exhibited at the Salon d'Automne. While living in Paris Epstein introduced Kandinsky and Franz Marc to the French art world, and also facilitated the inclusion of the French painter Robert Delaunay's work in the traveling Der Blaue Reiter exhibition of 1911.

She died on 22 January 1956 in Geneva, Switzerland.

References

External links
 
 images of Epstein's work on Artnet

1879 births
1956 deaths
Artists from Zhytomyr
20th-century Russian women artists
19th-century women artists from the Russian Empire